The Association of Electoral Administrators (AEA) is the main British organisation for local administrators (at councils) of elections, and is headquartered in Staffordshire.

History
The organisation was formed at a meeting in Wast Hills, in the west of Birmingham, in July 1987. Previously there had been no coordination between electoral officers at a national level. The first general meeting was held in February 1988 in Devon.

Function
It represents local electoral registration officers.

Structure
It is headquartered in the south of Cannock, near the A34.

See also
 Electoral Commission (United Kingdom)

References

External links
 AEA

1987 establishments in the United Kingdom
Cannock
Election and voting-related organizations
Elections in the United Kingdom
Organisations based in Staffordshire